Joseph H Leonard (August 28, 1876–September 23, 1946) was a United States Marine private received the Medal of Honor for actions during the Philippine–American War.

Leonard joined the Marine Corps from Brooklyn in June 1897, and was honorably discharged five years later. He later served during World War I from April 1918 to July 1919.

Medal of Honor citation
Rank and organization: Private, U.S. Marine Corps. (Enlisted as Joseph Melvin). Born: August 28, 1876, Cohoes, N.Y. Accredited to: New York. G.O. No.: 55, July 19, 1901.

Citation:

For distinguished conduct in the presence of the enemy in battles, while with the Eighth Army Corps on 25, 27, and March 29, and on April 4, 1899.

See also
List of Medal of Honor recipients

Notes

References

1876 births
1946 deaths
United States Marine Corps Medal of Honor recipients
United States Marines
American military personnel of the Philippine–American War
Philippine–American War recipients of the Medal of Honor
People from Cohoes, New York
People from Yountville, California